Camreta v. Greene, 563 U.S. 692 (2011), was a case in which the Supreme Court of the United States held that in the general case the Court may review a lower court's constitutional ruling at the behest of government officials who have won final judgment on qualified immunity grounds but could not for this case due to details specific to it.

See also
Saucier v. Katz
Ashcroft v. al-Kidd
 List of United States Supreme Court cases, volume 563

References

Further reading

External links
 

2011 in United States case law
United States Supreme Court cases
United States Fourth Amendment case law
United States Supreme Court cases of the Roberts Court